Sagh or Saq may refer to:
 Sagh, Markazi
 Sagh, Razavi Khorasan